Cae Mabon is a retreat centre in North Wales, set in an oak forest close to the disused Dinorwic Quarry and on the opposite side of the Padarn lake from the town of Llanberis. 

The centre has been run by its founder, local storyteller, author, and songwriter Eric Maddern, since 1989 and is well regarded for the beauty of its natural setting as well as the architecture of its alternative, low-impact buildings. 

In 2008, Cae Mabon was placed as the number one natural building project in the United Kingdom in the top ten list compiled by Professor Tom Woolley for sustain magazine. In the same year, the local authority granted retrospective planning permission on all the centre's alternatively constructed buildings, after support was shown for Cae Mabon by prominent local figures, including Dafydd Iwan. 

The name  means 'Field of Mabon' in Welsh, referring to Mabon ap Modron, a character from the Mabinogion.

References

Article 'Natural Building:10 of the Best', Sustain Magazine, McCelland Publishing Ltd, Volume 9 issue 5.

External links
 Cae Mabon Website
 Eric Maddern website

Buildings and structures in Gwynedd
Llanddeiniolen